Sun Yat-sen Memorial Hall Station is a station on Line 2 of the Guangzhou Metro that started operations on 29December 2002. It is located under Dongfeng Middle Road and Lianxin Road in the Yuexiu District of Guangzhou. The station is named for the Sun Yat Sen Memorial Hall, which was established in 1931 in memory of Dr. Sun Yat-Sen, the founder of the Republic of China. The English name of the station is the same as that of Sun Yat-sen Memorial Hall Station in Taipei, Taiwan's Metro system.

Nearby Places
Sun Yat Sen Memorial Hall
Yuexiu Park
Guangdong Provincial People's Government
Guangzhou No.2 High School
Guangdong Science Meseum
Guangzhou City People's Congress Standing Committee
Guangzhou General Labour Union

References

Railway stations in China opened in 2002
Guangzhou Metro stations in Yuexiu District